George André Martin (1910–1957), also known as Georges André-Martin, was a French actor and variety performer. In addition to performing on stage, he also appeared in a number of films and on television shows.

Filmography 
 1932: Baleydier
 1932: L'affaire de la rue Mouffetard
 1933: The Abbot Constantine
 1936: The Robber Symphony (as the Mayor)
 1954: On the Reeperbahn at Half Past Midnight

Finger dancing act 
Martin's signature act consisted in making his fingers take on human-like qualities and perform different kinds of dances, "[using] the forefingers of both hands to show taps, ballet, and ballroom stuff, covering his wrists with various cuffs". A reviewer from Time magazine, in 1936, described the act thus:

"M. Martin amiably drew on a pair of black gloves whose first and second fingers were missing. Over his four bare fingers he pulled two pairs of little red pants, apologizing for 'dressing in public.' Thus costumed, M. Martin's agile fingers looked like bare legs, his hands became an incredibly realistic team of tiny dancers."

There exists a short video, produced by British Pathé and entitled "Finger Dancing!", which shows him performing this act at the Trocadero Restaurant in London in 1933.

References

External links 
 
 
 Georges André-Martin at UniFrance

1910 births
1957 deaths
French male actors
Ventriloquists